William L. Lane (1931– March 8, 1999) was an American New Testament theologian and professor of biblical studies.

Background and education
Lane earned his B.A. from Wesleyan University, his M.Div. from Gordon Divinity School (1955), his Th.M. from Westminster Theological Seminary (1956), and his Th.D. from Harvard Divinity School.

Academic career
Lane began his academic career as professor of New Testament and Judaic studies at Gordon-Conwell Theological Seminary. He went on to serve as professor of religious studies at Western Kentucky University for fifteen years. During this time, he became a mentor to Christian singer and songwriter Michael Card. He was also recognized with the faculty award for "Distinguished Contributions in Research or Creativity" for the 1983–1984 academic year. Lane joined the faculty of Seattle Pacific University as dean of the School of Religion in 1989. He was named "Professor of the Year" by the student body in 1992, and served as the Paul T. Walls Chair in Wesleyan and Biblical Studies from 1993 until his retirement in 1997.

In addition to these roles, Lane also served as one of the translators of the New American Standard Bible, and the New International Version.

Death and legacy
In retirement, Lane moved with his wife to Franklin, Tennessee, where they established a residential biblical research library and discipleship center. Lane died of cancer in a hospital near Nashville, Tennessee, on March 8, 1999.

Publications
Lane was the author or editor of several notable works, including The Encyclopedia of Modern Christian Missions (1967), The New Testament Speaks (1969), The Gospel According to Mark in The New International Commentary on the New Testament (1974), and the two-volume commentary on the  Epistle to the Hebrews in the Word Biblical Commentary (1991), which was awarded the 1993 Christianity Today Critic's Choice for "Book of the Year".

Works

Books

Editorial

Articles

References

1931 births
1999 deaths
American theologians
New Testament scholars
Translators of the Bible into English
Seattle Pacific University faculty
Western Kentucky University faculty
Gordon–Conwell Theological Seminary faculty
Westminster Theological Seminary alumni
Harvard Divinity School alumni
Wesleyan University alumni
20th-century American translators
Bible commentators